Dušan Jovančić (born 19 October 1990) is a Serbian professional footballer who plays as a midfielder for Kazakh club Astana.

Club career

Borac Čačak
Jovančić joined Borac Čačak in 2012 at the invitation of club director Slobodan Ilić, who noticed him after he played for the amateur selection of the Football Federation of Belgrade. On December 2, 2015, Jovančić played for Borac Čačak in a 1-5 upset which eliminated heavily favored Red Star Belgrade in the second round of the 2015-16 Serbian Cup. He played a total of 88 games and scored one goal playing for Borac Čačak from 2012 to 2016.

Vojvodina
Jovančić signed a two-year contract with Vojvodina in January 2016. In January 2018, he signed a half-season extension, rejecting an offer from Partizan. By the time he left Vojvodina, he had played as the team captain.

Red Star Belgrade
On May 29, 2018, Jovančić signed a two-year contract with Red Star Belgrade, with an optional one-year extension. He was signed as a replacement for Mitchell Donald, who had been one of Red Star's defensive midfielders. On November 6, 2018, he injured his hamstring in a 2-0 win against Liverpool in the Champions League.

Astana
On 16 December 2022, Astana announced the signing of Jovančić.

Personal life 
On 22 June 2020 he tested positive for COVID-19.

Career statistics

Club

Honours

Club
Red Star Belgrade
Serbian SuperLiga (2): 2018–19, 2019–20

Individual
 Serbian SuperLiga Team of the Season: 2018–19

References

External links
 
 Dušan Jovančić stats at utakmica.rs 
 

1990 births
Living people
Footballers from Belgrade
Association football midfielders
Serbian footballers
FK Zemun players
FK Borac Čačak players
FK Vojvodina players
Red Star Belgrade footballers
Çaykur Rizespor footballers
FC Tobol players
Serbian First League players
Serbian SuperLiga players
Süper Lig players
Kazakhstan Premier League players
Serbian expatriate footballers
Serbian expatriate sportspeople in Turkey
Expatriate footballers in Turkey
Serbian expatriate sportspeople in Kazakhstan
Expatriate footballers in Kazakhstan